Sar Jub-e Qaleh Masgareh (also Romanized as Sar Jūb-e Qal‘eh Masgareh; also known as Sar Jūb and Sarjūb-e Soflá) is a village in Osmanvand Rural District, Firuzabad District, Kermanshah County, Kermanshah Province, Iran. At the 2006 census, its population was 284, in 57 families.

References 

Populated places in Kermanshah County